Chalmers-Wesley United Church is a Protestant church located within the walls of Old Quebec at 78, rue Sainte-Ursule in Quebec City, Quebec, Canada. Designed by architect John Wells for the Free Presbyterian Church of Canada, the church was built from 1851-1853 and opened for worship on March 6, 1853. It is particularly admired for its Gothic Revival design.

In 1925, the church became part of the newly formed United Church of Canada. Composer William Reed was notably the church's organist from 1900-1913. In 1931, the congregation of the nearby Wesleyan Methodist Church, which had also become part of The United Church of Canada, merged with Chalmers United Church and was renamed Chalmers-Wesley United Church.

References

External links
Chalmers-Wesley United Church

United Church of Canada churches in Quebec
Churches in Quebec City
Churches completed in 1853
19th-century Presbyterian churches
1853 establishments in Canada
John Wells (architect) buildings
19th-century United Church of Canada church buildings
Gothic Revival architecture in Quebec City
Gothic Revival church buildings in Canada